Calodesma exposita is a moth of the family Erebidae. It was described by Arthur Gardiner Butler in 1877. It is found in Brazil.

References

Calodesma
Moths described in 1877